Robert Abbie Orrock (25 May 1885 – 1969) was a Scottish footballer who played as a defender.

Career
Born in Kinghorn, Fife, Orrock played club football for East Stirlingshire (two spells), Falkirk, St Mirren and Alloa Athletic. He won the Scottish Cup with Falkirk in 1913 during a nine-year spell at the club, and made one appearance for Scotland in 1913; a decade later he was a guest member of Third Lanark'a squad which toured South America.

References

1885 births
Footballers from Fife
Scottish footballers
Scottish Football League players
Scottish Junior Football Association players
Scotland international footballers
East Stirlingshire F.C. players
Falkirk F.C. players
St Mirren F.C. players
Alloa Athletic F.C. players
Association football defenders
Date of death unknown
1969 deaths
Third Lanark A.C. players